McLay is a surname. Notable people with the surname include:

Alma Soller McLay (1919–2017)
Andy McClay (born 1972), Scottish footballer
Cameron McLay, American police chief
Charles McLay, Australian architect
Colin McLay, New Zealand marine biologist
Daniel McLay (born 1992), British cyclist
David McLay, Scottish footballer
George McLay (1889–1917), Scottish footballer
Greg McLay (born 1969), Australian cricketer
Jim McLay (born 1945), New Zealand politician

See also
 McLay Glacier, a glacier in Antarctica
 Maclay (disambiguation)
 Macklay